Illuminator is a fictional Christian superhero appearing in American comic books published by Marvel Comics, which debuted during a collaboration with Thomas Nelson. The character has starred in self-titled limited series comics during 1993, released along with Marvel Comics adaptions of the story of Easter, In His Steps, The Screwtape Letters, and The Pilgrim's Progress.

Fictional character biography
The character's alter ego is Andrew Prentiss a student and citizen scientist from Fairview, Tennessee, part of Nashville. During a night at summer camp a light envelops him, it gives him the power of flight, luminescence, and durability. He initially assumes the powers must have been granted by extraterrestrials, but after returning home he saves himself and his brother from a demonic possessed man, and an elderly biker named Gus who witnessed the ordeal recognizes the powers as being divine in nature. His powers are dependent on his Christian faith, which is depicted through his luminescence, and he uses his powers to combat demonic villains. He is one of the Marvel Universe's Earth-616 human mutate characters.

Supporting characters
His family consists of his parents Jay and Joan Prentiss, and his siblings Diana "Didi" Prentiss and Skip Prentiss.

Villains
Nightfire, also known as Nick Malloy, is a human transformed into a demon due to a mystical necklace.
Gunthar, a demon made from stone under the control of an amethyst.

Publication history

References

External links
 
 

Comics characters introduced in 1993
Christian comics
Marvel Comics characters who can move at superhuman speeds
Marvel Comics characters with accelerated healing
Marvel Comics characters with superhuman strength
Fictional characters who can manipulate light
Marvel Comics male superheroes
Marvel Comics superheroes